Danny Koevermans (born 1 November 1978) is a Dutch former professional footballer who played as a forward.

Club career

Early career
Born in Schiedam, Koevermans began his career with the amateurs of Excelsior'20, then went to Sparta Rotterdam, playing there for five seasons.

AZ
In 2005, Koevermans switched to AZ, where he started as a second-choice centre forward, although he bagged numerous goals. His breakthrough came in the 2006–07 season, being one of Eredivisie's top scorers with 22, and reaching the Netherlands national football team, aged 28.

He rejected a contract offer from AZ to extend his tenure at the club and his manager Louis van Gaal informed him that he would not be a first-team regular from then on with this resulting in his pushing for a move to another club.

PSV Eindhoven
Late August 2007 Koevermans joined PSV Eindhoven for a fee of €6 million where he received the number 10 jersey, last worn by Ivorian striker Arouna Koné, who was sold to Sevilla FC.

Toronto FC
On 29 June 2011, it was announced the Koevermans had reached an agreement to join Major League Soccer team Toronto FC (TFC) as a designated player. The signing of former German International Torsten Frings was announced at the same press conference. Koevermans made his debut for Toronto in a 1–0 home defeat to FC Dallas on 20 July 2011. He scored his first goal for Toronto on a cross from Ryan Johnson three days later against Sporting Kansas City in a 4–2 away loss. He was awarded MLS Player of the week for his two-goal performance against Colorado Rapids on 17 September, leading Toronto to a 2–1 home victory over the reigning league champions.

After failing to score in the first six games of the 2012 season Koevermans scored his first goal against Montreal Impact on 7 April, the game finished in a 2–1 away loss for Toronto. 

Perhaps Koevermans most memorable act during his time with TFC was after their ninth straight loss at the start of the 2012 season, when he said the club was "setting a record as the worst team in the world," and Koevermans reiterated the sentiment at the next training session when he said "name me one team in the whole world that is 0-9."

In mid-2012, Koevermans was in fine scoring form but suffered a season-ending ACL injury in mid-July against New England Revolution. Following his injury Toronto was forced to bring in designated player Eric Hassli as a replacement. Koevermans made his return from injury nearly a year later on 1 June 2013 as a second half sub for Jeremy Brockie in a 1–1 against Philadelphia Union.

FC Utrecht
On 31 January 2014, it was announced that Koevermans had signed a deal until the summer of 2014 with FC Utrecht. On 20 March 2014, Koevermans announced his retirement from football due to a persevering calf injury.

International career
Koevermans made his international debut for the Netherlands in a Euro 2008 qualifier against Slovenia on 28 March 2007. He scored his first international goal on 17 November 2007 against Luxembourg.

Style of play
A forward, Koevermans was a physical player who was apt in the air and a lethal poacher in front of the goal. In addition to goal scoring, he was known for his offensive movement and "runs" off the ball, which "always [attracted] the attention of defenders".

Career statistics

Club

International
Scores and results list the Netherlands' goal tally first, score column indicates score after each Koevermans goal.

Honours
PSV Eindhoven
Eredivisie: 2007–08
Johan Cruijff Shield: 2008

Toronto FC
Canadian Championship: 2012

References

External links
 
 
 

1978 births
Living people
Association football forwards
Dutch footballers
Dutch expatriate footballers
Netherlands international footballers
Sparta Rotterdam players
AZ Alkmaar players
PSV Eindhoven players
FC Utrecht players
Eredivisie players
Eerste Divisie players
Major League Soccer players
Footballers from Schiedam
Toronto FC players
Expatriate soccer players in Canada
Dutch expatriate sportspeople in Canada
Designated Players (MLS)